Rautalilja - romaani lemmestä ja mammonasta (Finnish: The Iron Lily - A Novel About Love and Mammon ) is a historical novel by Finnish author Kaari Utrio.

1979 novels
Novels by Kaari Utrio
Historical novels
Tammi (company) books
20th-century Finnish novels
Finnish historical novels